Decker Corner is an unincorporated community in the Town of Cedarburg, Ozaukee County, Wisconsin, United States.

Decker Corner was named for a family who lived at the local crossroads.

Notes

Unincorporated communities in Ozaukee County, Wisconsin
Unincorporated communities in Wisconsin